Let's Get It is the debut studio album by American hip hop recording artist Cash Out. It was released on August 26, 2014, by Bases Loaded Records and eOne Music. The album features guest appearances from Wiz Khalifa, Ty Dolla $ign, French Montana, Shanell, Rich Homie Quan and Waka Flocka Flame. It was supported by three singles, "She Twerkin", "Mexico" and "She Wanna Ride".

Singles
 The album's lead single, "She Twerkin" was released on February 25, 2014. The song peaked at number 98 on the US Billboard Hot 100, making it his second overall Hot 100 entry.
 The album's second single, "Mexico" was released on April 22, 2014.
 The album's third single, "She Wanna Ride" featuring Shanell, was released on August 5, 2014.

Critical reception 

The album was met with positive reviews, David Jeffries of AllMusic said Let's Get It takes the lightheaded and lighthearted club hit "She Twerkin" and blows it up to an album, as "Stunt on Ya Haters" and "She Wanna Ride" come packaged in the same mix of stoned and slick. "Mexico" introduces the rapper's ridiculous Latino accent imitation, which pops up like a weird Speedy Gonzales character throughout the LP, while the well-chosen guest list of French Montana, Waka Flocka Flame, and Rich Homie Quan are all simpatico with the hardcore yet hedonistic world of Ca$h Out.

Track listing 
Album credits adapted from official liner notes.

Notes
"Let's Get It" features uncredited vocals by Ty Dolla $ign and Wiz Khalifa.

Charts

Release history

References 

2014 debut albums
E1 Music albums
Albums produced by LRoc
Southern hip hop albums
Hip hop albums by American artists
Albums produced by Southside (record producer)
Albums produced by Metro Boomin
Albums produced by TM88